Maggie Ferguson (born in Sydney) is an Australian violinist and bandoneonista who studied orchestral tango at Orquesta Escuela de Tango Emilio Balcarce in Buenos Aires from 2003. In 2009, with the Sydney Youth Orchestras Association (SYO), she created Tango Oz, Australia's first national tango orchestra which she directs from the bandoneon. TangoOz were the focus of Sydney's first Tango Escuela held by the SYO in collaboration with the Conservatorium High School in July 2009 under the guest direction of Ignacio Varchausky and Santiago Polimeni. A second collaboration with Canberra Youth Music occurred in 2010 for Resonate Festival, including William Barton, Ignacio Varchausky and Santiago Polimeni. This showcased the traditional Argentine tango instrument, bandoneon performed with improvised didgeridoo.

Discography
 Tango Project Loco Bohemia 2012, recorded in Buenos Aires.

Living people
Bandoneonists
Australian violinists
Tango musicians
Musicians from Sydney
Year of birth missing (living people)
21st-century violinists